Leonardo Artur de Melo (born 23 March 1995) is a Brazilian footballer who plays for Sampaio Corrêa as a winger.

Career
Léo began his career in the youth squad of Corinthians. He was part of the squad that won the Copa São Paulo de Futebol Júnior in 2012. He was called up by then manager Tite to integrate the main team of Corinthians in 2013. After that he was loaned several times, including Guarani, Penapolense, Paysandu, Mogi Mirim, Oeste and Osasco Audax. He was reintegrated to Corinthians on April 13, 2017.

Career statistics

Honours
Corinthians
Campeonato Paulista: 2013

External links
 

1995 births
Living people
Brazilian footballers
Sport Club Corinthians Paulista players
Guarani FC players
Clube Atlético Penapolense players
Paysandu Sport Club players
Mogi Mirim Esporte Clube players
Oeste Futebol Clube players
Grêmio Osasco Audax Esporte Clube players
Associação Atlética Ponte Preta players
Associação Ferroviária de Esportes players
Fluminense FC players
Sport Club do Recife players
Campeonato Brasileiro Série A players
Campeonato Brasileiro Série B players
Campeonato Brasileiro Série D players
People from Osasco
Association football forwards
Footballers from São Paulo (state)